Promised Land is a ghost town in Sunflower County, Mississippi, United States.

References

Former populated places in Sunflower County, Mississippi
Former populated places in Mississippi